Calhoun County is a county located in the U.S. state of Florida. As of the 2020 census, the population was 13,648, making it the fifth-least populous county in Florida. Its county seat is Blountstown.

History

Calhoun County was created in 1838. It was named for John C. Calhoun, member of the United States Senate from South Carolina and the seventh U.S. vice president, serving under John Quincy Adams and Andrew Jackson. The County was originally located between St. Joseph Bay and the Apalachicola River, with the county seat at St. Joseph (which was abandoned by 1844 due to a yellow fever epidemic and hurricanes).

In the late 1850s, there was a violent feud between the local Durden family and another anti-Durden group. This feud escalated and there was a breakdown of the law, with roaming gangs and a "pitched battle" at the courthouse square in Blountstown. The violence got so bad that the county judge had to call in aid from the Fifth Florida Militia Regiment, which deployed 150 militiamen to breakup the outlaw bands. 

The county was later expanded to the north with territory from Jackson and Washington counties. In 1913, part of Calhoun County was transferred to the new Bay County. In 1925, the southern part of Calhoun County was separated as the new Gulf County, which included the territory that had formed the original Calhoun County.

In 1930, a federal employee shot the County Sheriff over a dispute of unknown origin.

Geography
The county is bounded on the east by the Apalachicola River and is bisected by the Chipola River, site of Look and Tremble.

Unincorporated areas
Among the unincorporated settlements are Broad Branch, Chipola, Clarksville, Chason, Durham, Fisher Corner, Flowers Still, Henderson Mill, Kinard, Leonards, New Hope, Rollins Corner, Selman, Sharptown, Summerville, and Willis.

Adjacent counties
 Jackson County, Florida – north
 Gadsden County, Florida – northeast (EST)
 Liberty County, Florida – east (EST)
 Gulf County, Florida – south (southern part of the county is in the EST)
 Bay County, Florida – west

Demographics

As of the 2020 United States census, there were 13,648 people, 4,510 households, and 2,753 families residing in the county.

As of the census of 2000, there were 13,017 people, 4,468 households, and 3,132 families residing in the county. The population density was 23 people per square mile (9/km2). There were 5,250 housing units at an average density of 9 per square mile (4/km2). The racial makeup of the county was 79.87% White, 15.79% Black or African American, 1.26% Native American, 0.53% Asian, 0.05% Pacific Islander, 1.04% from other races, and 1.45% from two or more races. 3.78% of the population were Hispanic or Latino of any race.

There were 4,468 households, out of which 32.50% had children under the age of 18 living with them, 52.30% were married couples living together, 13.50% had a female householder with no husband present, and 29.90% were non-families. 26.50% of all households were made up of individuals, and 12.40% had someone living alone who was 65 years of age or older. The average household size was 2.53 and the average family size was 3.02.

In the county, the population was spread out, with 23.20% under the age of 18, 9.00% from 18 to 24, 31.50% from 25 to 44, 22.30% from 45 to 64, and 14.00% who were 65 years of age or older. The median age was 36 years. For every 100 females there were 117.20 males. For every 100 females age 18 and over, there were 120.80 males.

The median income for a household in the county was $26,575, and the median income for a family was $32,848. Males had a median income of $26,681 versus $21,176 for females. The per capita income for the county was $12,379. About 14.80% of families and 20.00% of the population were below the poverty line, including 23.60% of those under age 18 and 20.40% of those age 65 or over.

Transportation

Major roads

Calhoun County is not served by any Interstate or U.S. Highways; the nearest access to the Interstate Highway System is Interstate 10  in Sneads in neighboring Jackson County and to the U.S. Highway System is U.S. Route 231 in northeastern Bay County.

  FL 20 is major east–west state highway linking Niceville to the state capital Tallahassee.
  FL 69 begins at FL 71 in Blountstown.
  FL 71 is major north–south state highway linking Port St. Joe to Alabama.
  FL 73 begins at FL 71 in southern Calhoun County.

Airport
 Calhoun County Airport (Florida)

Politics

Voter registration
According to the Secretary of State's office, Republicans hold a narrow majority among registered voters in Calhoun County as of 2022. However, Democrats held a sizable majority of registered voters as recently as 2017.

Statewide elections
Like most of the Florida Panhandle, Calhoun County votes heavily Republican in presidential and congressional races yet still occasionally supports conservative Democrats in local and state contests.

County commissioners
Lee Lee Brown (District 1)
Aaron Carter (District 2)
Darryl O'Bryan (District 3)
Scott Monlyn (District 4)
Gene Bailey (District 5)

Local elected officials
Clerk of Court: Carla Hand
County Sherriff: Glenn Kimbrel
 Supervisor of Elections: Sharon Chason
 Property Appraiser: Carla Peacock
 Tax Collector: Becky Smith

Education

Primary and secondary schools
Calhoun County School District operates public schools. Its two senior high schools are Blountstown High School and Altha Public School.

Library
Along with the six branches within the Calhoun County Public Library System, Calhoun County is also a part of the Panhandle Public Library Cooperative System. PPLCS also includes Holmes and Jackson counties. Branches are located in the following communities and offer public computers with internet access, free wi-fi, programming for all ages, downloadable e-books and e-audiobooks, and numerous online databases and resources.
 Blountstown Public Library
 Altha Public Library
 Hugh Creek Public Library
 Kinard Public Library
 Mossy Pond Public Library
 Shelton Public Library

Communities

Towns
 Blountstown
 Altha

Unincorporated communities

 Abe Springs
 Broad Branch
 Carr Community
 Chason
 Chipola
 Chipola Park
 Clarksville
 Cox
 Eufala
 Frink
 Gaskins
 Iolee
 Kinard
 Leonards
 Marysville
 McNeal
 New Hope
 Ocheesee Landing
 Ocheeseulga
 Pine Island
 Rollins Corner
 Scotts Ferry
 Selman
 Willis

See also
 National Register of Historic Places listings in Calhoun County, Florida

Notes

References

External links

Government links/Constitutional offices
 Calhoun County Board of County Commissioners
 Calhoun County Supervisor of Elections
 Calhoun County Property Appraiser
 Calhoun County Sheriff's Office
 Calhoun County Tax Collector

Special districts
 Calhoun County School District
 Northwest Florida Water Management District

Judicial branch
 Calhoun County Clerk of Courts
  Circuit and County Court for the 14th Judicial Circuit of Florida serving Bay, Calhoun, Gulf, Holmes, Jackson and Washington counties

Tourism links
 Calhoun County Chamber of Commerce

 
1838 establishments in Florida Territory
Populated places established in 1838
Florida counties
North Florida